UFC 143: Diaz vs. Condit was a mixed martial arts event organized by Ultimate Fighting Championship on February 4, 2012 at the Mandalay Bay Events Center in Las Vegas, Nevada.

Background
An episode of UFC Primetime returned to promote the main event.

Georges St-Pierre was originally scheduled to defend his title in the Welterweight division against Nick Diaz in the main event. However, on December 7, 2011 it was revealed that St-Pierre was injured and could not fight. Diaz instead faced Carlos Condit.  The original opponent for Condit, Josh Koscheck, faced Mike Pierce at this event.

Erik Koch was expected to fight with Dustin Poirier, but was injured and was to be replaced by Ricardo Lamas.  However, Lamas ended up injured as well and was replaced by future UFC Featherweight Champion Max Holloway who made his UFC debut in this event.

Amir Sadollah was scheduled to fight Jorge Lopez at the event, but due to an injury was replaced by Matthew Riddle.

Justin Edwards was expected to face Stephen Thompson, but was injured and replaced by Daniel Stittgen.

Results

Bonus awards
Fighters were awarded $65,000 bonuses.	

 Fight of the Night: Fabrício Werdum vs. Roy Nelson
 Submission of the Night: Dustin Poirier
 Knockout of the Night: Stephen Thompson

Reported Payout

The following is the reported payout to the fighters as reported to the Nevada State Athletic Commission. It does not include sponsor money and also does not include the UFC's traditional "fight night" bonuses.

Carlos Condit: $110,000 (includes $55,000 win bonus) def. Nick Diaz: $200,000
Fabrício Werdum: $100,000 (no win bonus) def. Roy Nelson: $20,000
Josh Koscheck: $146,000 (includes $73,000 win bonus) def. Mike Pierce: $20,000
Renan Barão: $22,000 (includes $11,000 win bonus) def. Scott Jorgensen: $20,500
Ed Herman: $62,000 (includes $31,000 win bonus) def. Clifford Starks: $8,000
Dustin Poirier: $24,000 (includes $12,000 win bonus) vs. Max Holloway: $6,000
Edwin Figueroa: $16,000 (includes $8,000 win bonus) def. Alex Caceres: $8,000
Matt Brown: $30,000 (includes $15,000 win bonus) def. Chris Cope: $8,000
Matt Riddle: $30,000 (includes $15,000 win bonus) def. Henry Martinez: $6,000
Rafael Natal: $20,000 (includes $10,000 win bonus) def. Michael Kuiper: $6,000
Stephen Thompson: $12,000 (includes $6,000 win bonus) def. Dan Stittgen: $6,000

See also
List of UFC events
2012 in UFC

References

Ultimate Fighting Championship events
2012 in mixed martial arts
Mixed martial arts in Las Vegas
2012 in sports in Nevada

pt:UFC 146